The 1918 Mecklenburg-Strelitz state election was held on 15 December 1918 to elect the 42 members of the constituent assembly of the Free State of Mecklenburg-Strelitz.

Results

References 

Mecklenburg-Strelitz
Elections in Mecklenburg-Western Pomerania